The Budhi Ganga River is a tributary of the Karnali River in Nepal. The source of this river is Jagadullah lake in the Bajura District of Nepal. Budhi Ganga passes through Achham District, crosses Sanfebagar Municipality in Achham under Seti-Lokmarga Road before continuing beyond Sanfebagar Bazar, through Chitre and along the river bank to meet the Seti River at the border of Achham district and Doti district, before washing out into the Karnali River.

References

Rivers of Sudurpashchim Province